In taxonomy, Methanosaeta is a genus of microbes within Methanosaetaceae. Like other species in this family, those of Methanosaeta metabolize acetate as their sole source of energy.  The genus contains two species, Methanosaeta concilii, which is the type species (type strain GP6) and Methanosaeta thermophila. For a time, some scientists believed there to be a third species, Methanosaeta soehngenii, but because it has not been described from a pure culture, it is now called Methanothrix soehngenii.

Phylogeny

Importance
Methanosaeta species are some of the most active methanogens in wetlands, producing an extensive amount of methane on Earth. The presence of methane is both good and bad. On one hand, methane is 20 times more effective than carbon dioxide in retaining heat—thus contributing to global warming at an increasing rate. On the other hand, methane can be used as bioenergy in an effort to move from large-scale fossil fuel usage to large-scale bioenergy usage, reducing carbon emissions. Scientists at UMass Amherst discovered that Methanosaeta have the ability to reduce carbon dioxide to methane through electrical connections with other microorganisms.

See also
 List of Archaea genera

References

Further reading

Scientific journals

Scientific books

Scientific databases

External links

Archaea genera
Euryarchaeota